Budd Peak is a peak  west of Mount Berrigan and  west-southwest of Stor Hanakken Mountain in Enderby Land. It was plotted from air photos taken from Australian National Antarctic Research Expeditions aircraft in 1957, and named by the Antarctic Names Committee of Australia for W. Budd, glaciologist at Wilkes Station in 1961.

References
 

Mountains of Enderby Land
Landforms of Enderby Land
Australian Antarctic Territory